Halloweentown or Halloween Town may refer to:

Halloweentown series
Halloweentown (film), a Disney Channel Original Movie released in 1998
Halloweentown II: Kalabar's Revenge, the sequel released in 2001
Halloweentown High, the third film in the series released in 2004
Return to Halloweentown, the fourth and final film in the series released in 2006
 Halloween Town, the main setting for the 1993 film Tim Burton's The Nightmare Before Christmas
 Halloween Town, the band headed by musical artist Ryan Pardey

Fictional locations of Disney